The 1901 Cincinnati Reds season was a season in American baseball. The team finished in last place in the eight-team National League with a record of 52 wins and 87 losses, 38 games behind the Pittsburgh Pirates.

Regular season 
The Cincinnati Reds continued to rebuild by adding younger players to their roster in 1901. They finished the 1900 season with a 62–77 record, finishing in seventh place in the National League.

The team dismissed manager Bob Allen after only one season, and replaced him with Reds legend Bid McPhee. McPhee had played second base for Cincinnati from 1882–1899. The Reds acquired a new shortstop, as George Magoon joined the club. He last played in the majors in 1899, splitting time between the Baltimore Orioles and Chicago Orphans. Dick Harley, who played in only five games with the Reds in 1900, would get a starting job in left field. Harley's last full season was in 1899 with the Cleveland Spiders, when he hit .250 with a homer and 50 RBI.

Sam Crawford was a bright spot for the team, as he batted .330 with a league high sixteen home runs, while driving in 104 runners to lead the team offensively. Jake Beckley was solid once again, hitting .307 with three home runs and 79 RBI.

On the mound, Noodles Hahn had a very solid season, going 22–19 with a 2.71 ERA.  Hahn led the league with 41 complete games, 375.1 innings pitched, and striking out 239 batters. Bill Phillips, with a 14–18 record and a 4.64 ERA, was the only other Cincinnati pitcher to have ten or more victories.

Season summary 
Cincinnati got the season off on a good note, as they won four of their first five games to take a very early first place lead in the National League.  The Reds would continue to hold on to first place through twenty-three games in, as they had a 15–8 record, a one-game lead over the New York Giants. Even though Cincinnati went 5–6 in their next eleven games, they held on to a first place tie with the Giants before losing ten games in a row to fall to seventh place with a 20–24 record. Some of their losses were lopsided, as the Reds lost 25–13 to the Giants to begin their losing streak, and in their tenth loss, they were on the wrong side of a 21–3 pasting by the Brooklyn Superbas.

After snapping their ten-game losing streak with a victory over the Philadelphia Phillies, the Reds lost four more in a row, including losses of 8–0 and 19–1 to the Phillies. Cincinnati continued to struggle for the rest of the season, falling into the cellar, and finished the year with a 52–87 record, 38 games behind the pennant-winning Pittsburgh Pirates. This marked the first time in team history that the Reds finished the season in last place.

Season standings

Record vs. opponents

Roster

Player stats

Batting

Starters by position 
Note: Pos = Position; G = Games played; AB = At bats; H = Hits; Avg. = Batting average; HR = Home runs; RBI = Runs batted in

Other batters 
Note: G = Games played; AB = At bats; H = Hits; Avg. = Batting average; HR = Home runs; RBI = Runs batted in

Pitching

Starting pitchers 
Note: G = Games pitched; IP = Innings pitched; W = Wins; L = Losses; ERA = Earned run average; SO = Strikeouts

Other pitchers 
Note: G = Games pitched; IP = Innings pitched; W = Wins; L = Losses; ERA = Earned run average; SO = Strikeouts

References

External links
1901 Cincinnati Reds season at Baseball Reference

Cincinnati Reds seasons
Cincinnati Reds season
Cincinnati Reds